Manuel María Ponce Cuéllar (8 December 1882 – 24 April 1948) was a Mexican composer active in the 20th century.  His work as a composer, music educator and scholar of Mexican music connected the concert scene with a mostly forgotten tradition of popular song and Mexican folklore. Many of his compositions are strongly influenced by the harmonies and form of traditional songs.

Biography

Early years 
Born in Fresnillo, Zacatecas, Manuel Maria Ponce moved with his family to the city of Aguascalientes only a few weeks after his birth and lived there until he was 15 years old.

He was famous for being a musical prodigy; according to his biographers, he was barely four years of age when, after having listened to the piano classes received by his sister, Josefina, he sat in front of the instrument and interpreted one of the pieces that he had heard. Immediately, his parents had him receive classes in piano and musical notation.

Traveling years 

In 1901 Ponce entered the National Conservatory of Music, already with a certain prestige as a pianist and composer. There he remained until 1903, the year in which he returned to the city of Aguascalientes. This was only the beginning of his travels. In 1904 he traveled to Italy for advanced musical studies at the Conservatorio Giovanni Battista Martini in Bologna.

He studied in Germany as a pupil of Martin Krause at the Stern conservatory in Berlin between 1906 and 1908.

Years at the National Conservatory 

After his years abroad, Ponce returned to Mexico to teach piano and music history at the National Conservatory of Music from 1909 to 1915 and from 1917 to 1922. He spent the intervening years of 1915 to 1917 in Havana, Cuba.

In 1912 he composed his most famous work "Estrellita" (little star), which is not a normal love song, as is usually thought, but "Nostalgia Viva" (live nostalgia).

That same year, Ponce gave in the "Arbeau Theater" a memorable concert of Mexican popular music which, though it scandalized ardent defenders of European classical music, became a landmark in the history of the national song.

Heitor Villa-Lobos (1887–1959), who met Ponce in Paris in the 1920s, wrote 

With valuable activity promoting music of the country and writing melodías like "Estrellita", "A la orilla de un palmar", "Alevántate", "La Pajarera", "Marchita el Alma" and "Una Multitud Más", Ponce gained the honorific title Creator of the Modern Mexican Song. He was also the first Mexican composer to project popular music onto the world stage: "Estrellita", for example, has been part of the repertoire of the main orchestras of the world and countless singers, although quite often the interpreter ignores the origin of the song as well as its author.

In 1947 he received the National Science and Arts Prize.

He was married to Clementina Maurel, next to whom he died in Mexico City. 
His body was buried in the Roundhouse of the Illustrious Men in the Pantheon of Dolores in Mexico City. A prominent monument to Ponce is found in the main square of Aguascalientes, the city where he grew up and first studied music.

Recordings by Ponce 
Ponce participated in the following recordings:
Manuel María Ponce: Concierto para piano y orquesta (Ponce on piano; Orquesta Sinfónica de México; conducted by Carlos Chávez) (Radio Mil, 1942) 

Ponce recorded the following works on Duo-Art piano rolls between 1916 and 1920:
5789 Ponce - Mexican Barcarolle
5807 Ponce - Cuban Serenade
5924 Ponce - Mexican Serenade
5930 Ponce - Moonlight
5937 Ponce - Sono mi Mente-Loca (Cuban Song)
6294 Ponce - Quando vene la Primavera (When Spring Comes)

Music
Ponce wrote music for solo instruments, chamber ensembles, and orchestra. His piano and guitar works outnumber those dedicated to other solo instruments within the set of pieces we know. Estrellita is Ponce's best known work.

Guitar music 

Ponce's guitar music is a core part of the instrument's repertory, the best-known works being Variations and Fugue on 'La Folia' (1929) and Sonatina meridional (1939). He also wrote a guitar concerto Concierto del Sur, which is dedicated to his long-time friend and guitar virtuoso Andrés Segovia. His last known work dedicated to Father Antonio Brambila, Variations on a Theme of Cabezón, was written in 1948, a few months before his death. It is unclear whether the variations are indeed based upon a theme by Antonio de Cabezón or if the theme was the work of Ponce's teacher, the organist Enrico Bossi. The following is only a select number of his most significant contributions.

Scherzino Mexicano (1909) (originally written for piano)
24 Preludes
Canciones populares mexicanas: La pajarera, Por ti mi corazón, La valentina (ca. 1925–1926)
Sonata mexicana (1923)
Thème varié et Finale (1926)
Sonata No. 3 (1927)
Sonata clásica (1928)
Sonata romántica (1929)
Suite in A minor (1929)
Cuatro Piezas, including  Mazurka and Valse
Variations and Fugue on 'La Folia' (1929)
Valse (1937)
Sonatina meridional (1939)
Variations on a Theme of Cabezón (1948)
Dos Vinetas (posthumous)

It was Ponce who anonymously created the striking arrangement for guitar of J. S. Bach's Prelude from the first cello suite as performed and recorded by Segovia.  

Ponce also composed a "Sonata for Guitar and Harpsichord." Segovia ascribed the Sonata's prelude to the lutenist and Bach contemporary S. L. Weiss.  Segovia recorded this piece both as a solo and as a duet, performed with harpsichordist Rafael Puyana.

Piano works 

Suite Cubana
Cuatro Danzas Mexicanas
3 Intermezzi
Balada Mexicana (versions for piano solo and for piano & orchestra)
Mazurcas
Concierto romántico para piano y orquesta
4 Scherzinos
Estudios de concierto
Elegía de la ausencia
Tema mexicano variado
Rapsodia Cubana
Rapsodias Mexicanas
Preludio y fuga sobre un tema de Handel
Preludios y fuga sobre un tema de Bach
Sonata No. 2
5 Evocaciones
Romanza de amor
Suite bitonal

Songs 

"Adiós mi bien"
"Aleluya"
"Alevántate"
"Cerca de tí"
Cinco poemas chinos
Cuatro poemas de F.A. de Icaza
Dos poemas alemanes
Dos poemas de B. Dávalos
"Estrellita" (1912)
"Forse"
"Ho bisogno"
"Insomnio"
"Isaura de mi amor"
"La pajarera"
"Lejos de tí"
"Lejos de tí" II
"Marchita el alma"
"Necesito"
"Ofrenda"
"Poema de primavera"
"Por tí mi corazón"
"Romanzeta"
"Sperando, sognando"
Seis poemas aracáicos
Serenata mexicana
"Soñó mi mente loca"
"Tal vez"
"Toi"
Tres poemas de E. González Martínez
Tres poemas de M. Brull
Tres poemas de Lermontow
Tres poemas de R. Tagore
Tres poemas franceses
"Tú"
"Último ensueño"
"Una multitud más"

Folk song arrangements

"A la orilla de un palmar"
"A ti va"
"Acuérdate de mí"
"Adiós mi bien"
"Ah, que bonito"
"Cerca de mí"
"Cielito lindo"
"Cuiden su vida"
"China de mi alma"
"De tres flores"
"Dolores hay"
"Dos seres hay"
"El bracero"
"El desterrado"
"Estrella del norte"
"Hace ocho meses"
"La barca del marino"
"La despedida"
"La ola"
"Palomita"
"La palma"
"La peña"
"La visita"
"Nunca, nunca"
"Ojitos aceitunados"
"Oye la voz"
"Para amar sin consuelo"
"Para qué quiero la vida"
"Perdí un amor"
"Perdida ya toda esperanza"
"Pobre del hombre pobre"
"Por esas calles"
"Por tí mujer"
"Que chulos ojos"
"Que lejos ando"
"Que pronto"
"Quisiera morir"
"Si alguna vez"
"Si eres receuerdo"
"Si alguna ser"
"Son las horas"
"Soy paloma errante"
"Te amo"
"Todo pasó"
"Trigueña hermosa"
"Valentina"
"Ven oh luna"
"Vengo a saber si tú me amas"
"Voy a partir"
"Ya sin tu amor"
"Yo me propuse"
"Yo mismo no comprendo"
"Yo te quiero"

Chamber music 

Miniatures for violin, viola and cello (1927)
Quartet for 2 violins, viola and cello (1932)
Sonata a dúo for violin and viola (1936–1938)
Trio for violin, viola and cello (1943)
Trio romántico for violin, cello and piano
Canción de otoño for violin and piano
Sonata for cello and piano
Sonata for guitar and harpsichord
Quartet for guitar and strings

Orchestral works 

Chapultepec
Cantos y danzas de los antiguos mexicanos
Estampas Nocturnas
Instantáneas mexicanas
Poema elegíaco
Ferial

Concertos 
Concierto Romántico for piano and orchestra (1910)
Concierto para piano No. 2 (1946, incomplete)
Concierto del Sur for guitar and orchestra (1941)
Violin Concerto (1943)

Notes about the works 
An important group of Ponce's works were previously unknown to the public, as self-proclaimed heir Carlos Vázquez, a Mexican piano performer and educator who studied with Ponce, kept most of the original manuscripts in his possession.  Most of them were finally donated to the National School of Music (UNAM) in Mexico City, as an analytic catalogue of his works could still be published.

Additionally, Vazquez donated parts of Ponce's belongings to the Manuel M. Ponce Museum in Zacatecas. Unfortunately, Vazquez passed away a few months before the opening of the museum. 

One of Ponce's melodies still heard today in various arrangements is "Estrellita" (1912).

References

Sources
Corazón Otero: Manuel M. Ponce y la guitarra, Mexico 1980. First published in English by Musical New Services Limited, UK in 1983, 1994 
"Andrés Segovia, Manuel M. Ponce, Miguel Alcázar, Peter Segal: "The Segovia - Ponce Letters", Columbus, OH, Editions Orphée, 1989 
Ricardo Miranda Pérez, Grove Music Online
Jorge Barrón Corvera: "Manuel María Ponce: A Bio-Bibliography", Westport, CT, Praeger, 2004 
 Henderson, John. A Directory of Composers for Organ, Third Revised and Enlarged Edition. John Henderson (Publishing) Ltd., 2005, p. 585, (Ponce entry page 585)
 Vinton, John ed. Dictionary of Contemporary Music, E.P. Dutton & Co., 1974, p. 581-582, (Ponce entry page 581 / page 582)
 Randel, Don Michael. Harvard Concise Dictionary of Music, The Belknap Press of Harvard University Press, 1978 (Second printing 1979), p. 397, (Ponce entry page 397)

External links
International Jose Guillermo Carrillo Foundation 
Peermusic Classical: Manuel Ponce Composer's Publisher and Bio
Manuel Ponce and the Suite in A minor: Its Historical Significance and an Examination of Existing Editions (2005) by Kevin R. Manderville
Ponce's Baroque Pastiches, by Peter Kun Frary, Professor of Music - University of Hawaii

1882 births
1948 deaths
Conservatorio Giovanni Battista Martini alumni
École Normale de Musique de Paris alumni
People from Fresnillo
Mexican male classical composers
Mexican classical composers
20th-century classical composers
Composers for the classical guitar
20th-century male musicians